Hoffecker, the surname of two United States representatives from Delaware, may refer to:

John H. Hoffecker (1827–1900)
Walter O. Hoffecker (1854–1934)